Passey is a surname. Notable people with the surname include:

Anna Passey (born 1984), English actress
Michael Passey (born 1937), English cricketer
M. N. Passey (1934–2002), Indian physician and rheumatologist 
Peter Passey (born 1952), English footballer

English-language surnames